The 2017 Hi-Tec Oils Bathurst 6 Hour was an endurance race for Group 3E Series Production Cars and other invited cars. The event, which was staged at the Mount Panorama Circuit, near Bathurst, in New South Wales, Australia, on 16 April 2017, was the second running of the Bathurst 6 Hour. The race was won by Luke Searle and Paul Morris, driving a BMW M135i. Morris became the first driver to win the three major endurance races at Bathurst, having previously won the Bathurst 1000 in 2014 and the Bathurst 12 Hour in 2007 and 2010. This feat was later achieved by Shane van Gisbergen.

Class structure 
Cars competed in the following classes:
 Class A1: Extreme Performance (Forced Induction)
 Class A2: Extreme Performance (Naturally Aspirated)
 Class B1: High Performance (Forced Induction)
 Class B2: High Performance (Naturally Aspirated)
 Class C: Performance
 Class D: Production
 Class I: Invitational

Results 

 Class winners are shown in bold text.
 Race time of winning car: 6:01:28.885
 Pole position: 2:25.487, Grant Sherrin
 Fastest race lap: 2:25.802, Chaz Mostert

References 

Motorsport in Bathurst, New South Wales
Hi-Tec Oils Bathurst 6 Hour